The Stade d'Oyem is a stadium in Oyem, Gabon. This 20,500 capacity stadium opened for use in the 2017 Africa Cup of Nations.

References

Football venues in Gabon
Athletics (track and field) venues in Gabon
2017 Africa Cup of Nations stadiums
Sports venues completed in 2016